Theodor Gilbert Morell (22 July 1886 – 26 May 1948) was a German medical doctor known for acting as Adolf Hitler's personal physician. Morell was well known in Germany for his unconventional treatments. He assisted Hitler daily in virtually everything he did for several years and was beside Hitler until the last stages of the Battle of Berlin. Morell was granted high awards by Hitler, and became a multi-millionaire from business deals with the Nazi government made possible by his status.

Early years
Morell was the second son of a primary school teacher, born and raised in the small village of Trais-Münzenberg in Upper Hesse. He studied medicine in Grenoble and Paris, then trained in obstetrics and gynecology in Munich in 1910. On 23 May 1913, he completed his doctoral degree and was fully licensed as a physician. He served as a ship's doctor until 1914, when he volunteered for service at the Front during the First World War. Morell served as an army battalion medical officer until 1917. By 1918, he was in Berlin with his own medical practice, and in 1920 he married Hannelore Moller, a wealthy actress. He furnished his office with the latest medical technology through his wife's fortune. He targeted his unconventional treatments at an upscale market, his practice becoming fashionable for treatment of skin and venereal diseases, and turned down invitations to be personal physician to both the Shah of Persia and the King of Romania.

Career

Hitler's physician
Morell joined the Nazi Party when Hitler came to power in 1933. In 1935, Hitler's personal photographer, Heinrich Hoffmann, was successfully treated by Morell. Hoffmann told Hitler that Morell had saved his life. Hitler met Morell in 1936, and Morell began treating Hitler with various commercial preparations, including a combination of vitamins and hydrolyzed E. coli bacteria called Mutaflor, which successfully treated Hitler's severe stomach cramps. Through Morell's prescriptions, a leg rash which Hitler had developed also disappeared. Hitler was convinced of Morell's medical genius and Morell became part of his social inner circle.

Some historians have attempted to explain this by citing Morell's reputation in Germany for success in treating syphilis, along with Hitler's own (speculated) fears of the disease, which he associated closely with Jews. Others have commented on the possibility that Hitler had visible symptoms of Parkinson's disease, especially towards the end of the war.

Hitler recommended Morell to others of the Nazi leadership, but most of them, including Hermann Göring and Heinrich Himmler, dismissed Morell as a quack. As Albert Speer related in his autobiography:

When Hitler was troubled with grogginess in the morning, Morell would inject him with a solution of water mixed with a substance from several small, gold-foiled packets, which he called "Vitamultin". Hitler would arise, refreshed and invigorated. Hitler gave a packet to Himmler, who immediately became suspicious and instead secretly ordered one of his SS physicians, Ernst-Günther Schenck, to have it tested in a laboratory. It was found to contain methamphetamine. On at least one occasion, Hitler ordered his private train stopped so that Morell could inject him without worrying about the train jostling.

Speer characterised Morell as an opportunist, who once he achieved status as Hitler's physician, became extremely careless and lazy in his work. By 1944, Morell developed a hostile rivalry with Dr. Karl Brandt, who had been attending Hitler since 1934. Though criticized by Brandt and other physicians, Morell was always "restored to favor".

Morell was not popular with Hitler's entourage, who complained about the doctor's crude table manners, poor hygiene and body odor.  Hitler is said to have responded "I do not employ him for his fragrance, but to look after my health." Hermann Göring called Morell Der Reichsspritzenmeister, ("Reich Master of Injections"), and variations on that theme, implying that Morell resorted to using drug injections when faced with medical problems, and overused them.

Substances administered to Hitler
Morell kept a medical diary of the drugs, tonics, vitamins and other substances he administered to Hitler, usually by injection (up to 20 times per day) or in pill form. Most were commercial preparations, some were Morell's own mixes. Since some of these compounds are considered toxic, historians have speculated that Morell inadvertently contributed to Hitler's deteriorating health. The fragmentary list (below) of some 74 substances (in 28 different mixtures) administered to Hitler include psychoactive drugs such as heroin as well as commercial poisons. Among the compounds, in alphabetical order, were:
 Brom-Nervacit:  bromide, Sodium diethylbarbiturate, Pyramidon, since August 1941 a spoonful of this tranquilizer almost every night, to counteract stimulation from methamphetamine and to allow sleep.
 Cardiazol and Coramine:  since 1941 for leg oedema.
 Chineurin:  Quinine-containing preparation for common colds and flu.
 Cocaine and adrenaline (via eye drops)
 Coramine:  Nikethamide injected when unduly sedated with barbiturates. In addition, Morell would use Coramine as part of an all-purpose "tonic".
 Cortiron:  Desoxycorticosterone Acetate IM injections for muscle weaknesses, influencing carbon hydrate metabolism.
 Doktor Koster's Antigaspills:  2–4 pills before every meal, for a total of 8–16 tablets a day, since 1936 Belladonna extractum and Strychnos nux vomica in high doses, for meteorism.
 Enbasin: Sulfonamide, intragluteal 5cc, for diverse infections.
 Euflat:  Bile extract, Radix Angelica, Aloes, Papaverine, Caffeine, Pancreatine, Fel tauri – pills, for meteorism, and treatment of digestion disorders
 Eukodal:  heavy doses Oxycodone, for intestinal spasms, painkiller
 Eupaverin:  Moxaverine, an isoquinoline derivative for intestinal spasms and colics.
 Glucose: 1938 until 1940 every third day Glucose injections 5 and 10%, for potentiation of the Strophanthus effect
 Glyconorm:  metformin, Metabolism Enzymes (Cozymase I and II), Amino acids, Vitamins – injectable solution as a strengthener tonic
 Homatropin:  Homatropine. HBr 0.1g, NaCl 0.08g; Distilled water added 10 ml. Eye drops for right eye problems.
 Intelan:  twice a day Vitamins A, D3 and B12 – tablets as a strengthener, tonic.
 Camomilla Officinale:  chamomile – intestinal enemata, on the patient's personal request
 Luitzym:  after each meal Enzymes with Cellulase, Hemicellulases, Amylase, Proteases for intestinal problems, meteorism.
 Mutaflor:  Emulsion of Escherichia coli-strains – enteric coated tablets for improvement of intestinal flora. They were prescribed to Hitler for flatulence in 1936, the first unorthodox drug treatment from Morell; bacteria cultured from human feces, see: "E. coli"
 Omnadin:  Mixture of protein compounds, biliary lipids and animal fat, taken at the onset of infections (together with Vitamultin).
 Optalidon:  Caffeine, Propyphenazone – tablets at the beginning of infections (together with Vitamultin)
 Orchikrin:  an extract of bovine testosterone, pituitary gland, and glycerophosphate, as a tonic, strengthener. Marketed also as an aphrodisiac.
 Penicilline-Hamma:  Penicillin – powder Topical antibiotic. After the attempted assassination of July 20, 1944 to treat his right arm.
 Pervitin:  methamphetamine injections for mental depression and fatigue
 Progynon B-Oleosum:  Estradiol Valerate, Benzoic ester of follicle hormone, for Improvement of the circulation in the gastric mucosa.
 Prostacrinum: two ampoules every second day for a short period in '43, extract of seminal vesicles and prostate – injected IM for mental depression
 Prostophanta:  Strophantine 0.3 mg, Glucose, Vitamin B, Nicotinic acid – IM heart glycoside, strengthener.
 Septoid:  intravenous injections of 10 cc of 3% iodine (in potassium iodide form) with 10 cc of 20% glucose, two or three times a day, to improve heart's condition and the altered Second Sound.
 Strophantin:  '41 to '44 – cycle of 2 weeks of homeopathic Strophanthus gratus glycoside 0.2 mg per day for coronary sclerosis.
 Sympatol:  oxedrine tartrate since '42, 10 drops daily for increasing the cardiac minute volume
 Testoviron:  Testosterone propionate as a tonic, strengthener.
 Tonophosphan:  '42 to '44, Phosphoric preparation – SC tonic, strengthener
 Ultraseptyl:  Sulfonamide for respiratory infections
 Veritol:  since March '44 Hydroxyphenyl-2-methylamino-propane – eyedrops for left eye treatment
 Vitamultin-Calcium:  Caffeine, Vitamins.
An almost complete listing of the drugs used by Morell, wrote historian Hugh Trevor-Roper, was compiled after the war from his own meticulous daily records unlikely to have been exaggerated.

World War II
In 1939, Morell inadvertently became involved with the invasion of Czechoslovakia. The Czechoslovak president, Emil Hacha, became so scared at Hitler's outburst that he fainted. Morell injected stimulants into Hacha to wake him, and although he claimed these were only vitamins, they may have included methamphetamine. Hacha soon gave in to Hitler's demands.

When Reinhard Heydrich, who was serving as Reich Protector of Bohemia and Moravia – the rump left of Czechoslovakia after Hitler's annexation of the Sudetenland – was the victim of an assassination attempt in May 1942, Morell was one of the doctors brought in by Heinrich Himmler to treat the badly-wounded SS man.  His recommendation to use antibiotics was ignored by Heinrich Himmler's chief doctor, Karl Gebhardt, gangrene set in, and Heydrich died a week later.

After the 20 July 1944 assassination attempt against Hitler, Morell treated him with topical penicillin, which had only recently been introduced into testing by the U.S. Army. Where he acquired it is unknown, and Morell claimed complete ignorance of penicillin when he was interrogated by American intelligence officers after the war. When members of Hitler's inner circle were interviewed for the book The Bunker, some claimed Morell owned a significant share in a company fraudulently marketing a product as penicillin.

When Hitler developed jaundice in September 1944, Dr. Erwin Geising – an ear, nose and throat specialist who had originally been brought in to treat the dictator after the damage done to his eardrums from the bomb explosion of the 20 July plot – began to be suspicious of Morell's treatment of Hitler.  Suspecting that he knew the cause of the jaundice, Geising deliberately dosed himself with some of the "Dr. Koester's Anti-Gas Pills" which Morell had Hitler taking in large numbers every day, and found that they had effects that were mildly harmful.  Having them analyzed, he found they contained strychnine and belladonna, the strychnine being the cause of the jaundice. Geising reported his results to two of Hitler's other doctors, Karl Brandt and Hanskarl von Hasselbach, who in turn told other members of Hitler's retinue.  When word of this finally reached Hitler, he was furious.  Declaring that he had total faith in Morell and his treatments, he dismissed all three doctors – Geising, Brandt and Hasselbach – even though the latter two had been with him since his early days in power. Several months later, Brandt was imprisoned and condemned to death at the Nuremberg trials.

By April 1945, Hitler was taking many pills a day, along with numerous injections. The personal notes of Morell describe how he treated Hitler over the years, including notations such as, "injection as always", and, "Eukodal", an early German trade name for the opioid oxycodone.

Morell was one of the occupants of the Führerbunker, located in the garden of the Reich Chancellery, once Hitler and his entourage relocated there from the Wolf's Lair in Rastenburg in East Prussia.  As the Battle of Berlin progressed and the outlook became dire, it was Morell who provided the cyanide capsules which Eva Braun would later use to kill herself, and which Joseph Goebbels and his wife Magda used to murder their six children before killing themselves.

On 20 April 1945, Morell, Albert Bormann, Admiral Karl-Jesko von Puttkamer, Dr. Hugo Blaschke, secretaries Johanna Wolf, Christa Schroeder, and several others were ordered by Hitler to leave the bunker and Berlin by aircraft for the Obersalzberg. Hitler told Morell he did not need any more medical help, although he continued to take many of the medications Morell had prescribed for him; during the last week of Hitler's life, it was administered by Dr. Werner Haase and by Heinz Linge, Hitler's valet. The group flew out of Berlin on different flights by aircraft of the Fliegerstaffel des Führers over the following three days. Morell was on the flight which left Berlin on 23 April.

Personal awards and wealth
Hitler awarded Morell the title of Professor and gave him the Golden Party Badge and the Knights Cross of the War Merit Cross. Morell was able to use his relationship with Hitler to sell his "Vitamultin" to the German Labor Front and his delousing product "Rußla powder" to the Wehrmacht.

Final years and death
Morell was captured by American forces and interrogated on 18 May 1945. One of his interrogators was reportedly "disgusted" by his obesity and lack of hygiene. Although he was held in an American internment camp on the site of the former Buchenwald concentration camp, and questioned because of his proximity to Hitler, Morell was never charged with a crime. Grossly obese and suffering from poor health, he died in a Tegernsee hospital on 26 May 1948.

See also
 Adolf Hitler's health

References
Notes

Bibliography
 
 
 Doyle, D. (2005), Adolf Hitler's Medical Care (PDF), "Royal College of Physicians of Edinburgh", 35, pp. 75–82.
 
 
 
 
 
 
 Schramm, Percy Ernst (1978) "The Anatomy of a Dictator" in Hitler: The Man and the Military Leader. Detwiler, Donald S., ed.  Malabar, Florida: Robert E. Kreiger Publishing Company. ; originally published as the introduction to Picker, Henry (1963) Hitlers Tischgespräche im Führerhauptquarter ("Hitler's Table Talk")

External links
 

Personal staff of Adolf Hitler
German military doctors
Physicians in the Nazi Party
German Army personnel of World War I
People from the Grand Duchy of Hesse
Ludwig Maximilian University of Munich alumni
People from Wetteraukreis
Pseudoscientific diet advocates
Recipients of the Knights Cross of the War Merit Cross
1886 births
1948 deaths